Phoenix Group Holdings plc (formerly Pearl Group plc) is a provider of insurance services based in London, England. It is listed on the London Stock Exchange and is a constituent of the FTSE 100 Index.

History
The company was founded in 1857 as The Pearl Loan Company and operated from the Royal Oak Public House opposite the Whitechapel Bell Foundry. It changed its name to The Pearl Assurance Company in 1914, when it moved to 252 High Holborn where it was based until moving its head office to Peterborough in 1989. In 1990, it was acquired by the Australian insurance group, AMP, and in 2003, Pearl, NPI and London Life were demerged from AMP to become part of Henderson Group.

In 2005, the Pearl Group was bought from Henderson Group by Sun Capital Partners (a business in which Hugh Osmond is a leading partner) and TDR Capital. It acquired Resolution Life (including its Phoenix Assurance operations) in 2008. In 2009, the business was acquired by the Liberty Acquisition Holdings (International) Company (a vehicle controlled by billionaire Nicolas Berggruen), which subsequently renamed itself Pearl Group.

In 2010, Pearl Group rebadged as Phoenix Group Holdings. In March 2014, the business sold Ignis Asset Management to Standard Life Investments, the asset management arm of Standard Life.

In 2018, Phoenix Group agreed to acquire Standard Life Assurance from Standard Life Aberdeen for £2.9 billion. As part of the transaction Standard Life Aberdeen retained a stake in the combined group.

In 2020, Phoenix completed the acquisition of fellow closed book specialist ReAssure Group from Swiss Re.

In 2021, it was announced that Phoenix had acquired the rights to the Standard Life brand and had undertaken additional steps to simplify the relationship with Standard Life Aberdeen that had developed since the acquisition of the Standard Life business three years previously.

Operations
Phoenix Group comprises a number of regulated life companies in the UK:
 Phoenix Life, a closed life insurance business covering Phoenix Life and Phoenix Life Assurance (former Pearl Assurance)
 Phoenix Wealth, the UK-based pensions and investments previously offered by AXA Wealth
 Standard Life
 ReAssure, covering ReAssure and ReAssure Life and also including Ark Life
 SunLife
plus other unregulated businesses:
 Vebnet

See also
 Phoenix Fire Office

References

External links
 Official website

1857 establishments in England
British companies established in 1857
Companies based in Peterborough
Companies listed on the London Stock Exchange
Financial services companies based in the City of London
Financial services companies established in 1857
Insurance companies of the United Kingdom